Solntse may refer to:

 The Sun (film), a 2005 Russian biographical film 
 Solntse (album), a 2009 album by Ani Lorak
 Solntse (TV channel) - Russian TV channel